The 1921 William & Mary Indians football team represented the College of William & Mary as a member of the South Atlantic Intercollegiate Athletic Association (SAIAA) during the 1921 college football season. Led by Bill Fincher in his first and only season as head coach, the Indians compiled an overall record of 4–3–1 with a mark of 1–3–1 in conference play.

Schedule

References

William And Mary
William & Mary Tribe football seasons
William